Jules Brunard (6 May 1837, Cublize - 25 July 1910) was a French politician. He belonged to the Radical Party. He was a member of the Chamber of Deputies from 1902 to 1910. He died 25 July 1910 and was buried in the Guillotière Cemetery in Lyon.

References

1837 births
1910 deaths
People from Rhône (department)
Politicians from Auvergne-Rhône-Alpes
Radical Party (France) politicians
Members of the 8th Chamber of Deputies of the French Third Republic
Members of the 9th Chamber of Deputies of the French Third Republic